Annasahet Annasahedov (born 21 June 1992) is a Turkmen footballer who plays for Turkmen club FC Altyn Asyr. He was part of the Turkmenistan national team from 2018.

Club career

International career 
Played for Turkmenistan U21 national team at 2013 Commonwealth of Independent States Cup.

Annasähedow made his senior national team debut on 27 March 2018, in an 2019 AFC Asian Cup qualification – Third Round match against Bahrain national football team.

Honors
AFC President's Cup:
Winner: 2014

References

External links
 
 

1994 births
Living people
Turkmenistan footballers
Turkmenistan international footballers
Association football defenders
FC Ahal players
FC Altyn Asyr players